Peace Cradle is a sculpture by Dennis Smith. Two copies are installed in Salt Lake City, Utah; one is installed in the Gallivan Center and another represents Russia in Jordan Park's International Peace Gardens.

International Peace Gardens, Jordan Park
The bronze sculpture in Jordan Park's International Peace Gardens was dedicated in 1991. It measures approximately 36 x 31 x 17 inches and rests on a concrete base which measures approximately 38 x 39 x 26 inches. The artwork depicts two young girls playing “cat's cradle”. An inscription on the base reads: "PEACE CRADLE / by / Dennis Smith / In Memory of / LOWELL F. TURNER / 1916-1989". The artwork was surveyed by the Smithsonian Institution's "Save Outdoor Sculpture" program in 1993.

References

1991 sculptures
Bronze sculptures in Utah
Outdoor sculptures in Salt Lake City
Sculptures of children in the United States
Statues in Utah